Redskin is a slang term referring to Native Americans in the United States and Canada's First Nations.

Redskin or Redskins may also refer to:

 Washington Redskins, the former name of the NFL team now known as the Washington Commanders
 Other sports teams named Redskins
 Redskin (film), a 1929 American film
 Redskin (subculture), a marxist or anarchist skinhead
 The Redskins, a 1980s English band
 Redskins, a candy bar now known as Red Ripperz

See also

 Red skin (disambiguation)
 Potato#Pigmentation, for red-skinned potatoes
 RED People, a Malaysian online supergroup and artist management company
 Allium haematochiton, or redskin onion